Rowles Glacier is a tributary glacier over 20 nautical miles (37 km) long, flowing northwest along the east side of Dunedin Range, Admiralty Mountains, to enter Dennistoun Glacier. Mapped by United States Geological Survey (USGS) from surveys and U.S. Navy air photos, 1960–63. Named by Advisory Committee on Antarctic Names (US-ACAN) for D.S. Rowles of the New Zealand Department of Scientific and Industrial Research, a member of the Hallett Station party, 1964.
 

Glaciers of Pennell Coast